Geldermalsen is a railway station in the town of Geldermalsen, Netherlands. The station opened on 1 Nov 1868. The station is a junction, with an island platform for easy transfers. To reach the platforms from outside of the station, passengers must use a bridge.

The current building dates from 1884. The station is at the junction of two lines: the Utrecht–Boxtel railway and the Elst–Dordrecht railway. The station is currently served by trains from Qbuzz and NS. Previously, Arriva served this station along with NS, but on 9 Dec 2018, Qbuzz took over services from Arriva.

Train services

Bus services

References

External links
Arriva website 
Dutch Public Transport journey planner 

Railway stations in Gelderland
Railway stations opened in 1868
Railway stations on the Merwede-Lingelijn
Railway stations on the Staatslijn H
1868 establishments in the Netherlands
West Betuwe
Railway stations in the Netherlands opened in the 19th century